The In Between is an album by American jazz saxophonist Booker Ervin recorded in 1968 and released on the Blue Note label.

Reception
The Allmusic review by Stephen Thomas Erlewine awarded the album 4 stars and stated "The music rarely reaches avant-garde territory -- instead, it's edgy, volatile hard bop that comes from the mind as much as the soul... The result is a satisfying, cerebral set of adventurous hard bop that finds Booker Ervin at a creative peak".

Richard Cook and Brian Morton of The Penguin Guide to Jazz gave the album a three-star rating (of a possible four), noting that "unlike some other figures on the [Blue Note] label, Ervin seemed determined to show that there was still considerable mileage in hard bop, without needing to head off into 'the avant-garde'. In consequence, these half-dozen taut originals are every bit as challenging as the free jazz of the time, and commanded exceptional musicianship from a relatively obscure group."

Track listing
All compositions by Booker Ervin
 "The In Between" - 7:43
 "The Muse" - 7:17
 "Mour" - 5:59
 "Sweet Pea" - 5:36
 "Largo" - 6:27
 "Tyra" - 7:29

Personnel
Booker Ervin - tenor saxophone, flute
Richard Williams - trumpet (tracks 1-4 & 6)
Bobby Few - piano
Cevera Jeffries - bass
Lenny McBrowne - drums

References 

Blue Note Records albums
Booker Ervin albums
1968 albums
Albums recorded at Van Gelder Studio
Albums produced by Francis Wolff